Newcastle Casino opened in Newcastle, Oklahoma in 1998. The  casino is owned and operated by the Chickasaw Nation and is open 24 hours daily. Newcastle Casino features a restaurant and a sports bar.

Games
Newcastle Casino offers 14 table games including Blackjack, 3-Card Poker, Ultimate Texas Hold'Em, Roulette, Baccarat and has 3,000 electronic games.

Dining
The casino offers a restaurant and a full-service bar. Kitchen 44 offers a variety of Southern-style dishes for breakfast, lunch and dinner. The 82-seat restaurant is open 24 hours a day, seven days a week. Kitchen 44 also offers a Grab & Go menu with quick items for guests in a hurry. Front Row Sports Bar is a full-service bar with a select menu featuring chili pie, hot dogs, nacho, chips and candy. Guests can also enjoy their favorite sports game on one of nine flat-screen televisions.

References

External links 
Newcastle Casino Website
Newcastle Casino Twitter 
Newcastle Casino Facebook

Chickasaw Nation casinos
Casinos in Oklahoma
Tourist attractions in McClain County, Oklahoma
Buildings and structures in McClain County, Oklahoma